Three ships of the British Royal Navy have been named HMS Thruster:

 was a  launched in 1917 and broken up in 1937.
 was a Landing Ship, Tank launched in 1942 and transferred to the Royal Netherlands Navy in 1947 and named Pelikaan.
She was renamed HMS Thruster in 1947. Transferred to the Ministry of Transport in 1956 and renamed Empire Petrel. She was sold in 1968.

References
 

Thruster